The Tonquin Valley is located in Jasper National Park, Alberta, Canada, next to the border of the provinces of Alberta and British Columbia, an area which is also the continental divide, running along the peaks of the South Jasper Range (including The Ramparts subrange) which rise above Amethyst Lake. Tonquin Creek drains Moat Lake and flows west into Mount Robson Provincial Park in British Columbia, and empties into the Fraser River. The Astoria River drains south and east into the Athabasca River.

The Tonquin Valley leads to Tonquin Pass which cradles the Amythyst Lakes at its crest beneath the  Precambrian quartzite wall of the Ramparts.  The valley was named after the Pacific Fur Company ship Tonquin, destroyed in Clayoquot Sound in 1811.

Recreation
Within the valley there is the scenic Amethyst Lake and Moat Lake. It is a popular destination for back-country hikers, ski touring and horseback trips to the two outfitters camps on the shores of Amethyst Lake. There are also a number of backcountry campgrounds and an Alpine Club of Canada hut.

The 1928 High Trip of the Sierra Club took place in this area.  Among those who participated was photographer Ansel Adams and Sierra Club director William Colby.

Two trails into the valley are utilized by outfitters, skiers and hikers alike. There is the Portal Creek access, and the Astoria River access trails.  Unbeknownst to many is the older and unused access via the Meadow Creek trail. This trail is considered impassable as it has not been maintained for decades. Some portions of the current trail are visible in Google Earth.

Wildlife
The valley is a frequent locale for grizzly bears, cougars and elk during the summer months as well as mountain caribou, and other Rocky Mountain Wildlife. The lakes are home to an introduced, and stable populations of rainbow trout and brook trout.

References

Further reading
 Adams, Ansel (2013). Ansel Adams In The Canadian Rockies. Little, Brown and Company.

External links
 Jasper National Park at Parks Canada
 Public avalanche bulletins from Avalanche Canada. 
 Wates-Gibson hut at The Alpine Club of Canada
 Weather forecasts from Environment Canada
 Google Earth

Valleys of Alberta
Jasper National Park